Joseffy may refer to:

Josef P. Freud, Viennese magician known as Joseffy
Josef Ichhauser, Polish-born singer and actor known as Josef Joseffy
Rafael Joseffy, Hungarian pianist and composer